In physics, a magnetic photon is a hypothetical particle. It is a mixture of even and odd C-parity states and, unlike the normal photon, does not couple to leptons.  It is predicted by certain extensions of electromagnetism to include magnetic monopoles. There is no experimental evidence for the existence of this particle, and several versions have been ruled out by negative experiments.

The magnetic photon was predicted in 1966 by Nobel laureate Abdus Salam.

See also
 Dual photon, a different extension for magnetic monopoles

References

Obsolete theories in physics
Hypothetical elementary particles
Photons
Magnetic monopoles
Force carriers